The women's K-4 500 metres event was a fours kayaking event conducted as part of the Canoeing at the 2000 Summer Olympics program.

Medalists

Results

Heats
10 crews entered in two heats. The top three finishers from each of the heats advanced directly to the finals while the remaining teams were relegated to the semifinal.

Overall Results Heats

Semifinal
The top three finishers in the semifinal advanced to the final.

Final

Fischer became the first woman in any sport to win Olympic gold medals 20 years apart with this event and the first woman to win gold medals in five different Olympics in any sport. Kőbán's silver medal brought her career total to six: 2 gold, 3 silver, and 1 bronze.

References
2000 Summer Olympics Canoe flatwater results. 
Sports-reference.com women's 2000 K-4 500 m results.
Wallechinsky, David and Jaime Loucky (2008). "Canoeing: Women's Kayak Fours 500 Meters". In The Complete Book of the Olympics: 2008 Edition. London: Aurum Press Limited. p. 495.

Women's K-4 500
Olympic
Women's events at the 2000 Summer Olympics